Wragge is a surname, and may refer to:

 Betty Wragge (born 1918), American actress
 Chris Wragge (born 1970), American news anchor
 Clement Lindley Wragge (1852–1922), English meteorologist
 Edmund Wragge (1837–1929), British railway engineer 
 Ethan Wragge (born 1990), American basketball player
 Frank Wragge (born 1898), English footballer
 Sydney Wragge (1908–1978), American fashion designer (his B. H. Wragge label existed till 1971), first president of CFDA.
 Tony Wragge (born 1979), American football offensive lineman

See also
 Wragg
Wragge & Co